VOICE is a Bangladesh-based activist, rights based research and advocacy organization working around the issues of corporate globalization.

Campaigns

It critically campaigns on neo-liberal "economic hegemony", the role of international financial institutions (IFIs), WTO, TNCs and privatization. It works around aid conditions, food sovereignty, media, communication rights and information and communication technologies, governance and human rights, policy research and advocacy, both at local and national levels in Bangladesh to raise awareness and shape the public discourse against economic, social and cultural hegemony and injustice including "global capitalism and imperialism." 

VOICE is located in Shyamoli in Dhaka, the capital of Bangladesh.

Research, action

It works through networking and partnership for a new development paradigm establishing a micro-macro linkage in order to generate increased support for policy influencing. It has a team of activists on "research and actions and believes in promoting the capacity, knowledge and empowerment of people, the voices of unheard".

Campaign over monga

VOICE has published Monga: the art of politics of dying and The Politics of Aid: Conditionalities and Challenges  during the seventh summit of the World Social Forum in Kenya in January 2007.

Famine-like situation

Monga refers to a famine-like situation observed in several northern districts of Bangladesh, has been "recurring every year for decades", according to Voice. The two months of the monga season between September and October are generally marked by a dire lack of food, stemming from the lack of non-agricultural work and the agricultural off-season coinciding. Periodic famine stems from the neglect and lack of commitment on the part of successive governments of Bangladesh, who have consistently denied the very existence of the phenomenon, according to Voice.

Ahmed Swapan Mahmud is executive director of Voice, based at the Pisciculture Housing Society in the Shyamoli locality of Dhaka.

External links
VOICE official site, Bangladesh
APC on VOICE

Information and communication technologies in Asia
Non-profit technology
Non-profit organisations based in Bangladesh